Dhanya Mary Varghese is an Indian actress known for her work in the Malayalam cinema and television. She has appeared in over 20 films, the majority of which were in Malayalam. Aside from movies, she has appeared in a number of television shows.

She competed in Bigg Boss (Malayalam season 4) in 2022, where she made it to the top six finalists until having finished as the fourth runner-up. At the show's grand finale, she received an 'Award for Punctuality'. The show aired on Disney+ Hotstar and Asianet.

Early life and education
Varghese was born to Varghese and Sheeba at Idayar, Koothattukulam near Muvattupuzha, Kerala, India. She has a younger brother Dixon Paul Varghese, a Station Master in Southern Railway. She completed schooling at Little Flower Girls High School, Vadakara, St. Josephs Higher secondary school, Piravom and M.K.M. Higher Secondary School, Piravom. She is the product of famous institution Kalabhavan. She pursued bachelors and post graduation from St. Teresa's College in Kochi.

Career
She started her career as a junior artist, She was one of the group dancers in the song Thottuvilichalo.. in the movie Swapnam Kondu Thulabharam.She made her acting debut in the Tamil film Thirudi (2006) and later debuted in Malayalam through Nanma directed by Sharath Chandran Vayanad. She rose to prominence through her role in Thalappavu. She later acted in several Malayalam films such as Vairam: Fight For Justice, Kerala Cafe and Nayakan. She was one of the anchors in "Vanitha Asianet-Film awards 2009". She appeared on several Malayalam musical albums. She appeared as a guest judge in the 2010 season of the music reality-television program Idea Star Singer on Asianet.

Personal life
Varghese got engaged on 14 November 2011 with John, Winner of Tharolsavam program in Kairali channel. John and Dhanya got married on 9 January 2012 at Mateer Memorial Church, Trivandrum. After marriage she retired from film industry. The couple has a baby boy named Johan on 13 July 2013.

Filmography

Film

Television

Other shows

Awards

References

External links

 
 

Living people
Actresses in Malayalam cinema
Actresses from Kerala
People from Ernakulam district
Actresses in Tamil cinema
21st-century Indian actresses
Indian film actresses
Female models from Kerala
Actresses in Malayalam television
St. Teresa's College alumni
Bigg Boss Malayalam contestants
1985 births